The longfin catshark (Apristurus herklotsi) is a catshark of the family Scyliorhinidae found in the western Pacific from Japan to the Philippines, and the East and South China Seas, and the Kyūshū-Palau Ridge, at depths  between 530 and 865 m.  Its length is up to 48 cm.

Etymology
The Catshark is named in honor of botanist and ornithologist G. A. C. Herklots (1902-1986) of the University of Hong Kong.

References

 

longfin catshark
Marine fish of Southeast Asia
Taxa named by Henry Weed Fowler
longfin catshark